Timothy Reifsnyder (born February 7. 1986, Coatesville, Pennsylvania) is an American former child actor. He is one of the youngest to ever play Gavroche on Broadway in Les Miserables, as well as numerous guest starring roles on television. He is the brother to voice over actor, musician and songwriter Daniel Reifsnyder. After seven screen and television roles as a child and teen, his last screen role was a brief appearance in the 2014 pilot episode of How to Get Away with Murder.

Filmography

External links
 
 

Living people
1986 births
Male actors from Pennsylvania
American male musical theatre actors
American male television actors
American male film actors
People from Coatesville, Pennsylvania